Little Bear is a series of children's books, primarily involving the interaction of Little Bear (an anthropomorphic cub) and Mother Bear (his mother), written by Else Holmelund Minarik and illustrated by Maurice Sendak. Originally, the stories were simple, but eventually became more sophisticated in subsequent books as the plot and characters expanded.

The first four Little Bear books consist of four stories, each of which involves Little Bear and a slowly expanding cast of support characters, each named after their respective species. The Little Bear character and his immediate family display many bear-like characteristics and mannerisms, but only on occasion. They live in a culture and technology which seems to be the woodland version of a Little House on the Prairie setting, but with wealthier items. Little Bear is depicted as friendly and adventurous with his animal friends.

This series of books went on to spawn a TV series, Little Bear, including specials and a full-length direct-to-video release, the movie entitled The Little Bear Movie. The series was animated by Canadian studio Nelvana and starred Kristin Fairlie as the voice of Little Bear. The TV series aired on the Nick Jr. block.

The five original Little Bear books were illustrated by Maurice Sendak. In 2010, two years before her death, Minarik published a sixth book, Little Bear and the Marco Polo, which was illustrated by Dorothy Doubleday.

Little Bear books

 Little Bear (1957)
 Father Bear Comes Home (1959)
 Little Bear's Friend (1960)
 Little Bear's Visit (1961)
 A Kiss for Little Bear (1968)
 Little Bear and the Marco Polo (2010)

References

1950s children's books
1960s children's books
1957 children's books
American picture books
Picture books by Maurice Sendak
Anthropomorphic bears
Series of children's books
Books about bears
Harper & Brothers books
Book series introduced in 1957